Ski-like protein is a protein that in humans is encoded by the SKIL gene.

Interactions
SKIL interacts with SKI protein, Mothers against decapentaplegic homolog 3 and Mothers against decapentaplegic homolog 2.

Protein Family 
SKIL belongs to the Ski/Sno/Dac family, shared by SKI protein, Dachshund, and SKIDA1. Members of the Ski/Sno/Dac family share a domain that is roughly 100 amino acids long.

References

Further reading

Proteins
Genes
Genes on human chromosome 3
Human genes